The following radio stations broadcast on FM frequency 88.7 MHz:

Antarctica
88.7 FM at McMurdo, Ross Dependency

Argentina
 Alternativa in Berazategui, Buenos Aires
 Cadena Río in La Plata, Buenos Aires
 Cielo in Comodoro Rivadavia, Chubut
 Ciudad UNM in Moreno, Buenos Aires
 de la azotea in Mar del Plata, Buenos Aires
 Fahrenheit in Rosario, Santa Fe
 Fleming in Salta
 LRR300 Empedrado in Empedrado, Corrientes
 La Tribu in Buenos Aires
 Manantial in Buenos Aires
 Mix in Santa Fe de la Vera Cruz, Santa Fe
 Puerto in Seguí, Entre Rios
 Radio María in Lobos, Buenos Aires
 Radio María in Tres Arroyos, Buenos Aires
 Radio María in Villa Celina, Buenos Aires
 Radio Maria in Cerro Ancasti, Catamarca
 Radio María in Luque, Córdoba
 Radio Maria in Puerto Iguazú, Misiones
 Reves in Córdoba
 Sayhueque in Centenario, Neuquén
 Sensación in Lucas González, Entre Ríos
 Tierra in Rafaela, Santa Fe
 UNA in Paraná, Entre Ríos
 Wilde in Wilde, Buenos Aires

Australia
 ACTTAB Radio in Canberra, Australian Capital Territory
 2MWM in Sydney, New South Wales
 Triple J in Goulburn, New South Wales
 ABC Classic FM in Sunshine Coast, Queensland
 5CST in Adelaide, South Australia
 3BPH in Bendigo, Victoria
 EDM100 in Footscray, Victoria

Canada (Channel 204)
 CHOC-FM in Portneuf, Quebec
 CBAF-FM-10 in New Glasgow, Nova Scotia
 CKAR-FM in Muskoka (Huntsville), Ontario
 CBNC-FM in Stephenville, Newfoundland and Labrador
 CBOF-FM-9 in Chapeau, Quebec
 CBV-FM-4 in St-Pamphile, Quebec
 CFTW-FM in Whistler, British Columbia
 CFUR-FM in Prince George, British Columbia
 CHIC-FM in Rouyn-Noranda, Quebec
 CHVI-FM in Campbell River, British Columbia
 CIMX-FM in Windsor, Ontario
 CKSB-FM-2 in Saskatoon, Saskatchewan
 CKUG-FM in Kugluktuk, Nunavut
 CKYL-FM-4 in Valleyview, Alberta
 CKYM-FM in Napanee, Ontario
 VF2190 in Slave Lake, Alberta
 VF2585 in Hobbema, Alberta
 VF7334 in Vancouver, British Columbia

China 
 CNR China Traffic Radio in Nanning
 CNR The Voice of China in Urumqi
 CRI Hit FM in Beijing and Chengdu

Malaysia
 Terengganu FM in Kuala Terengganu, Terengganu
 TraXX FM in Seremban, Negeri Sembilan

Mexico
 XHBI-FM in Aguascalientes, Aguascalientes
 XHDAD-FM in La Piedad, Michoacán
 XHEX-FM in Culiacán (Bellavista), Sinaloa
 XHGDL-FM in Guadalajara, Jalisco
 XHITT-FM in Tijuana, Baja California
 XHJX-FM in Querétaro, Querétaro
 XHLUAD-FM in Gómez Palacio, Durango
 XHPECR-FM in Puerto Vallarta, Jalisco

Philippines
 DWLD in Batangas City
 DWDW in Puerto Princesa
 DYPC in Mandaue
 DXEZ in General Santos

United Kingdom
  All of United Kingdom

United States (Channel 204)
  in Spokane, Washington
  in Ada, Oklahoma
 KAZI in Austin, Texas
 KBKV in Breckenridge, Colorado
 KBLV (FM) in Tehachapi, California
  in Monroe, Louisiana
  in Socorro, New Mexico
  in De Queen, Arkansas
 KBVR in Corvallis, Oregon
 KCAM-FM in Glennallen, Alaska
  in Manitou Springs, Colorado
 KDMB in Moses Lake, Washington
  in South Greeley, Wyoming
 KDRW in Santa Barbara, California
 KEPI in Eagle Pass, Texas
 KETP in Enterprise, Oregon
 KEZF in Grants, New Mexico
  in Fargo, North Dakota
 KFOM in Stanton, Iowa
 KFXH in Marlow, Oklahoma
 KGNI in Gunnison, Colorado
 KGSF in Huntsville, Arkansas
 KHPH in Kailua, Hawaii
 KISL in Avalon, California
 KIYE in Kamiah, Idaho
  in Houston, Alaska
  in Kerrville, Texas
  in Kalispell, Montana
  in Lexington, Nebraska
  in Decorah, Iowa
 KLOY in Ocean Park, Washington
 KLUY in Searcy, Arkansas
 KLVP in Sandy, Oregon
 KLVV in Ponca City, Oklahoma
  in West Odessa, Texas
 KLYA in Yankton, South Dakota
 KMCU in Wichita Falls, Texas
 KMMK in Coggon, Iowa
  in Modesto, California
 KMSE in Rochester, Minnesota
  in Flagstaff, Arizona
  in Lakeview, Oregon
 KOAY (FM) in Middleton, Idaho
 KOKN in Oketo, Kansas
 KORB in Hopland, California
 KOTY in San Mateo, New Mexico
 KPLV in Corpus Christi, Texas
 KPPW in Williston, North Dakota
 KRBG in Hereford, Texas
 KRFH in Marshalltown, Iowa
 KRTC in Truth or Consequences, New Mexico
 KRVS in Lafayette, Louisiana
  in Alamosa, Colorado
 KSDQ in Moberly, Missouri
  in Claremont, California
  in Fort Worth, Texas
 KTMU in Muenster, Texas
 KTRM in Kirksville, Missouri
 KUAO in North Ogden, Utah
  in Calexico, California
 KUDI in Choteau, Montana
 KUHF in Houston, Texas
  in Reno, Nevada
 KUST (FM) in Moab, Utah
 KUWK in Kaycee, Wyoming
 KVCH in Huron, South Dakota
 KVHI in Raymondville, Texas
 KVIT in Chandler, Arizona
 KVKR in Pine Ridge, South Dakota
  in West Des Moines, Iowa
 KWPR in Lund, Nevada
  in Tulsa, Oklahoma
 KXEH in Victor, Montana
  in Sutter, California
  in Joplin, Missouri
 KXNM in Encino, New Mexico
 KYSK in Ririe, Idaho
 KYSO in Selma, Oregon
  in Kilgore, Texas
 WAGO (FM) in Snow Hill, North Carolina
 WAGP in Beaufort, South Carolina
  in Spring Hill, Tennessee
  in Buffalo, New York
  in Loogootee, Indiana
 WBIJ in Saluda, South Carolina
 WBWV in Beckley, West Virginia
  in Stroudsburg, Pennsylvania
 WCDG in Dahlonega, Georgia
 WCGT in Clintonville, Pennsylvania
 WCSF in Joliet, Illinois
  in Waynesburg, Pennsylvania
 WDLV in Fort Myers, Florida
 WEER in Montauk, New York
 WEGN in Kankakee, Illinois
 WEHA in Port Republic, New Jersey
 WELL-FM in Waverly, Alabama
  in Madison, Wisconsin
 WEUC in Morganfield, Kentucky
 WEYY in Tallapoosa, Georgia
 WFNP in Rosendale, New York
 WFOS in Chesapeake, Virginia
 WGFW in Drakes Branch, Virginia
 WGKZ-LP in Quinnesec, Michigan
  in Gary, Indiana
  in Clinton, New York
  in Anna, Ohio
 WHPJ in Hibbing, Minnesota
 WIAA (FM) in Interlochen, Michigan
  in Indianapolis, Indiana
  in Lexington, Tennessee
 WIQR in Lexington, Virginia
 WJCU in University Heights, Ohio
 WJDS in Sparta, Georgia
  in Jacksonville, Florida
 WJLN in White Springs, Florida
  in Smithfield, Rhode Island
  in Starkville, Mississippi
 WKMW in Americus, Georgia
 WKNZ in Harrington, Delaware
 WLCU (FM) in Campbellsville, Kentucky
 WLHE in Cadiz, Kentucky
 WLUW in Chicago, Illinois
  in Grand Marais, Minnesota
  in Whitesburg, Kentucky
  in Lumber City, Georgia
 WMVY in Edgartown, Massachusetts
 WMWI in Demopolis, Alabama
 WMYZ in The Villages, Florida
  in Spindale, North Carolina
  in West Haven, Connecticut
  in Batavia, Ohio
 WOFN in Beach City, Ohio
 WOTB in Pearl River, Louisiana
  in Champaign, Illinois
 WPJY in Blennerhassett, West Virginia
 WPRC in Sheffield, Illinois
  in Wayne, New Jersey
 WQKV in Warsaw, Indiana
 WQMN in Minocqua, Wisconsin
 WQOH-FM in Springville, Alabama
  in Muscle Shoals, Alabama
  in Raeford, North Carolina
 WREM in Canton, New York
 WRFW in River Falls, Wisconsin
 WRHU in Hempstead, New York
 WRHV in Poughkeepsie, New York
  in Elmhurst, Illinois
  in New Brunswick, New Jersey
  in Rutland, Vermont
 WRWA in Dothan, Alabama
 WRYV in Milroy, Pennsylvania
 WSIE in Edwardsville, Illinois
 WSIS (FM) in Riverside, Michigan
  in Hornell, New York
  in Sugar Grove, Illinois
  in Shippensburg, Pennsylvania
 WTMI in Fleming, New York
  in Columbus, Ohio
 WULV in Moundsville, West Virginia
 WUMV in Milford, New Hampshire
 WUSG-LP in Cambridge, Minnesota
 WVTX in Colchester, Vermont
 WWCF in McConnellsburg, Pennsylvania
  in Lincoln University, Pennsylvania
 WWQK in Oak Ridge, Tennessee
 WXDU in Durham, North Carolina
  in Harrisonburg, Virginia
 WXPH in Middletown, Pennsylvania
 WYBW in Key Colony Beach, Florida
  in Indianola, Mississippi

References

Lists of radio stations by frequency